Olbia was the westernmost town on the coast of ancient Pamphylia, which some ancient writers place in Lycia. Ptolemy places it between Phaselis and Attaleia. Stephanus of Byzantium blames Philo for ascribing this town to Pamphylia, since, as he asserts, it was situated in the territory of the Solymi, and its real name was Olba; but the critic is here himself at fault, confounding Olbia with the Pisidian Olbasa. Strabo describes Olbia as a strong fortress, and its inhabitants colonised the Lycian town of Cadrema.

Its site is located near Koruma, Asiatic Turkey.

References

Populated places in ancient Pamphylia
Populated places in ancient Lycia
Former populated places in Turkey